Talap is a town in Tinsukia district, Assam, India.

As of the 2011 Census of India, Talap has a total population of 2,674 people including 1,393 males and 1,281 females. The literacy rate of the Talap per the census is 80.40%.

References 

Villages in Tinsukia district